Wicomico River is the name of two rivers in Maryland in the United States:

 Wicomico River (Maryland eastern shore), in Wicomico County, Maryland, on the eastern shore of the Chesapeake Bay
 Wicomico River (Potomac River), a tributary of the Potomac River in south central Maryland

See also
Great Wicomico River, a tributary of Chesapeake Bay in eastern Virginia
Little Wicomico River, a tributary of Chesapeake Bay in eastern Virginia